The Bac-Man Geothermal Production Field, also known as the BacMan Geothermal Power Plant, is one of the geothermal power stations operated by Energy Development Corporation in the provinces of Albay and Sorsogon in the Philippines. It is named for its location in the municipalities of Bacon and Manito.

Current operation 
This geothermal field can produce 140 megawatts of electricity for the island of Luzon. It consists of two power plants:
 BacMan 1 - The Palayang Bayan area consisting 22 production wells and 9 reinjection wells.
 BacMan 2 - The Cawayan and Botong (decommissioned) area consisting 8 production wells and 7 reinjection wells.

History 
 In 1977, the exploration begins in the area of Cawayan operated by an Australian company.
 In 1979, the BacMan Geothermal Field was created.
 In 1993 to 1995, the first operational unit existed in Palayang Bayan called Palayang Bayan Unit 1 and 2.
 In 1996, the second operational unit was created in the Cawayan area.
 In 1998, the third operational unit occurred in Botong area but in 2004, it has decommissioned due to destruction of facilities.
 In 2007, the PNOC-EDC was privatized and transferred to the Lopez Group of Companies.

References 

Geothermal power stations in the Philippines
Buildings and structures in Albay
Buildings and structures in Sorsogon